Nicholas Bartlett (born 24 December 1979) is an Australian Kendo player. A 5th-dan black belt, Nick represented Queensland winning 1st place in the individual division at the 32nd Australian Kendo Championships in Reservoir, Victoria on 9–10 June 2007. Nick began studying Kendo in his freshman year at university and after moving to Japan in August 2006 he joined the Sukagawa Kendo Renmei where he is the captain of his kendo club.

Notes

References

External links
 Australian Kendo Renmei

See also
 Kendo
 Martial arts

Australian kendoka
Living people
1979 births
Sportspeople from Adelaide
Australian emigrants to Japan
People from Sukagawa